Ladislaus (III) Kán (? – before 13 May 1315), was a Hungarian oligarch in the Kingdom of Hungary who ruled de facto independently Transylvania. He held the office of Voivode of Transylvania (erdélyi vajda) (1295–1314 or 1315). Taking advantage of the internal discords within the kingdom, he could maintain his rule over Transylvania until his death even by struggling against the several claimants for the throne.

His life
Ladislaus Kán belonged to the Transylvanian branch of the kindred Kán which founded by Ladislaus' great-grandfather Julius I Kán. There is no any information on his early life, but he was one of the three sons of Ladislaus II, who held the office of judge royal (országbíró). His father died in or after 1278 and he inherited his possessions: Hosszúaszó (today Valea Lungă in Romania), Szépmező (today Șona in Romania), Bun (today Boiul Mare in Romania), Mezőszilvás, Septér (today Şopteriu in Romania) and Mezőörményes (today Urmeniş in Romania). By 1280, Ladislaus had been legally an adult and capable person. It is possible that a certain Ladislaus who sold his village Vasary in 1290, is identical with Ladislaus Kán.

Ladislaus Kán appeared in the sources in 1297 when he issued a charter; by that time, he had been holding the office of Voivode of Transylvania, i.e., he had been governing that province of the Kingdom of Hungary. Ladislaus replaced Roland Borsa in that position, who, initially loyal to the royal power, became the source of new conflicts and rebelled against his monarch, as a result he was dismissed. At that time, Ladislaus must have been one of the partisans of King Andrew III of Hungary (1290–1301), because he attended an assembly convocated by the king in Buda in 1298 and he was a member of the king's Council in 1299. Following the king's death, when several claimants for the throne were struggling with each other between 1301 and 1308, he probably did not intervene in their conflict. Nevertheless, during the period from 1297 until 1313, the kings of Hungary granted several possessions to him in the eastern parts of the kingdom, e.g., he received Veresegyháza (today Roşia de Secaş in Romania) before 1313.

Although he did not take part in the internal conflicts of the kingdom, he endeavoured to strengthen his authority, sometimes by using or abusing his office of Voivode of Transylvania. Moreover, he managed to expand his influence over several territories of the Transylvanian Saxons (who had been exempted from the Voivodes' jurisdiction before) and he usurped the office of the Counts of the Székelys (and therefore, he also gained control over the Székelys). He occupied the silver mine  of Altrodna (today Rodna in Romania); and he extended his properties even beyond Transylvania when he captured several possessions in Arad, Csanád and Krassó counties. It can be seen that Ladislaus Kán came into the possession of a considerable part of his properties by force and tyrannical means.

When (in 1306) he was reluctant to recognise the rule of King Charles I of Hungary, whose claim had been supported by the Popes, Pope Clement V ordered Vincent, the archbishop of Kalocsa to excommunicate Ladislaus and to place his territory under ecclesiastic interdict. In 1307, the archbishop of Kalocsa held out the prospect of the same ecclesiastic disciplinary actions against Peter Monoszló, bishop of Transylvania in case he would not excommunicate Ladislaus Kán who had seized the properties of the prelate of Kalocsa. Nevertheless, in the summer of 1307, Ladislaus Kán captured King Otto of Hungary, rival of King Charles I, during his visit in Transylvania, and had him imprisoned in one of his castles. It happened then that the royal crown of Hungary fell into his hands.

When Bishop Peter of Transylvania died (November 27, 1307), Ladislaus Kán captured the canons who had assembled to elect the new bishop; moreover, he demanded that one of his sons be elected and occupied the chapter's possessions. Although, in July 1308, he declared that he would not maintain his son's claim to the bishopric, but he suggested two new candidates to the canons. By July 1309, the threatened canons were yielding to extortion and elected Benedict, a former councillor of Peter, as the new Bishop of Transylvania.

In the autumn of 1308, he sent delegates to take part in the assembly held close to Pest, where the prelates and the barons of the kingdom recognised King Charles. He released King Otto in the same year and handed him over to Ugrin Csák (a most loyal man of King Charles) in Szeged. In the meanwhile, he married off his daughter to the "heretic" (that is, of Orthodox faith) son of Stefan Uroš II Milutin, the king of Serbia.

At that time, Cardinal Gentile Portino da Montefiore arrived to Hungary as the pope's legate and launched his operations both to prevent the marriage of the Voivode's daughter and to recover the crown. It was a sign of his failure that he did declare the excommunication of Ladislaus Kán on December 25, 1309. Because of the pressure on him, the Voivode was constrained to acknowledge King Charles I as his sovereign in a charter of his (issued in Szeged, on April 8, 1310). Moreover, he pledged to return the crown before July 1 (he fulfilled the promise) and vowed to give back a number of properties and offices he had seized with force, i.e., Ladislaus Kán himself assumed the obligation of giving up the office of the count of Bistritz (today Bistriţa in Romania) and Hermannstadt (today Sibiu in Romania) and the dignity of count of the Székelys.

In sign of their reconciliation, King Charles visited Transylvania in December, 1310, for the first time during his reign. The relations between the king and Ladislaus Kán must have returned to normal lastingly, since one of his property exchanges took place in the presence of the king in June 1313. This is the last occurrence of Ladislaus Kán who died probably in the end of 1314 or the beginning of 1315 (this is quite likely, since royal charters follow one another starting from March 1315, in which King Charles returned the properties having occupied with force by the late Voivode to their rightful owners). Following Ladislaus' death, his elder namesake son, Ladislaus IV Kán declared himself Voivode and rebelled against Charles I.

Ancestors

References

Sources

External links 
 Map - The oligarchs' "provinces" in the early 14th century

1315 deaths
13th-century Hungarian people
14th-century Hungarian people
Ladislaus III
Hungarian nobility
Voivodes of Transylvania
Oligarchs of the Kingdom of Hungary
Year of birth unknown
People excommunicated by the Catholic Church